The hairy-footed flying squirrel (Belomys pearsonii) is a flying squirrel found in the mountains of the eastern Himalaya, Southeast Asia, southern China, and the island of Taiwan.

The fur is red-brown on the top and white at the bottom. Characteristic are the long hair at the feet, which even covers the claws to protect against the cold in the higher altitudes. The body has a length of about 22 cm; the tail is another 13 cm long.

Taxonomy and systematics
As hairy-footed flying squirrel is related to the complex-toothed flying squirrel, some taxonomists have included the species to the genus Trogopterus. However, its status as distinct genus is now generally accepted. The species is named after John Thomas Pearson.

There are four subspecies: Belomys pearsonii pearsonii, B. m. blandus, B. m. kaleensis, and B. m. trichotis. B. m. kaleensis is endemic to Taiwan. It appears to be genetically distinct from Vietnamese specimens, which themselves represented two distinct lineages (of unknown subspecies). All three lineages are distinct enough to be recognized as separate species.

References

Flying squirrels
Rodents of Asia
Mammals of Bhutan
Rodents of China
Rodents of India
Rodents of Laos
Rodents of Myanmar
Mammals of Nepal
Mammals of Taiwan
Rodents of Thailand
Rodents of Vietnam
Mammals described in 1842
Taxa named by John Edward Gray